Chester James Ross (April 1, 1917 – February 21, 1989) was a Major League Baseball player. He played six seasons with the Boston Bees / Braves from 1939 to 1944.

References

External links

Boston Braves players
Boston Bees players
Major League Baseball left fielders
Major League Baseball outfielders
1917 births
1989 deaths
Baseball players from Buffalo, New York
Beaver Falls Bees players
Zanesville Greys players
Hartford Laurels players
Evansville Bees players
Montreal Royals players
Indianapolis Indians players
Baltimore Orioles (IL) players
Milwaukee Brewers (minor league) players